Takis Sinopoulos (Pyrgos, Elis, March 17, 1917 – Athens, April 25, 1981) was a Greek poet and a leading figure among the so-called first postwar generation of Greek poets. A doctor by profession, he came of age at the beginning of perhaps the most terrible decade of Greece's recent history, running from the Metaxas dictatorship through war, occupation and the horrors of civil war, many of which he experienced at first hand. These experiences, and their exorcism, inform much of his work, as did the colonels' dictatorship of 1967–1974. Alongside his poetry, he was an astute and prolific critic as well as a talented painter, and his encouragement help launch the very much younger poets who became known as the generation of the seventies.

Principal publications
 No Man's Land, 1952
 Songs, 1953
 The Meeting with Max, 1956
 Helen, 1958
 Night and Counterpoint, 1959
 The Song of Joanna and Constantine, 1961
 The Poetry of Poetry, 1964
 Deathfeast, 1972
 Stones, 1972
 Chronicle, 1975
 The Map, 1977
 The Book of Night, 1978

Translations

 Landscape of Death  The Selected Poems of Takis Sinopoulos, tr. K. Friar (1979)  [Greek & English texts]
 Selected Poems, tr. J. Stathatos (1981)

References

1917 births
1981 deaths
People from Pyrgos, Elis
Modern Greek poets
20th-century Greek poets